Jareerat “Baitong” Petsom (Thai: ใบตอง - จรีรัตน์ เพชรสม; born 12 May 1993) is a Thai environmental care advocate and beauty pageant titleholder declared as Miss Earth - Fire at the 21st edition of Miss Earth on 21 November 2021 and later crowned on 24 April 2022. She earned her bachelor's degree in architecture from the King Mongkut’s Institute of Technology Ladkrabang in Bangkok, Thailand.

Pageantry

Miss Universe Thailand 2017 and 2020 
On 15 July  2017, she competed against 39 other candidates at Miss Universe Thailand 2017. She finished Top 10.

On 10 October 2020, she was against 28 other candidates at Miss Universe Thailand 2020. She finished Top 20.

Miss Earth Thailand and Miss Earth 2021 
Petsom was at age 28 when crowned Miss Earth Thailand 2021. Petsom represented Thailand on 21 November 2021, at the International pageant of Miss Earth 2021 which was held virtually due to ongoing COVID-19 pandemic.

Special awards:
  Sportswear competition
  Beachwear competition
 Best Eco Video (Asia & Oceania)

Petsom ranked fourth at the end of the event and declared as Miss Earth - Fire by the host James Deakin which unofficially equivalent to 3rd runner-up.

On 24 April 2022, she has officially crowned by Lindsey Coffey Miss Earth 2020 within the presence of her predecessor Miss Earth - Fire 2020 Michala Rubinstein together with Miss Earth - Air 2021 Marisa Butler and Miss Earth Thailand national director Sirikan Onsonkran at InterContinental Hotel in Bangkok and received the official title sash.

Handover of reign 

On 29 August 2022, Petsom crowned her successor Spy Chawanphat Kongnim from Lopburi as Miss Earth Thailand 2022 at Grand Hyatt Erawan in Bangkok.

On 29 November 2022, Petsom crowned Andrea Aguilera Arroyave of Colombia as Miss Earth - Fire 2022 at the 22nd Miss Earth pageant held at Okada Manila in the Philippines.

Notes

References

Further reading

External links

See also
 Amanda Obdam
 Maria Poonlertlarp
 Paweensuda Drouin
 Anchilee Scott-Kemmis
 Punika Kulsoontornrut

Living people
1993 births
Jareerat Petsom
Jareerat Petsom
Miss Earth 2021 contestants
Miss Earth Thailand
Miss Universe Thailand